Ripexicium is a genus of fungi in the family Corticiaceae. It is a monotypic genus, containing the single species Ripexicium spinuliferum, found in the Solomon Islands.

References

External links
 

Corticiales
Monotypic Basidiomycota genera